Beverly Hills Cop II is a 1987 American buddy cop action comedy film directed by Tony Scott, written by Larry Ferguson and Warren Skaaren, and starring Eddie Murphy. It is the sequel to the 1984 film Beverly Hills Cop and the second installment in the Beverly Hills Cop film series. Murphy returns as Detroit police detective Axel Foley, who reunites with Beverly Hills detectives Billy Rosewood (Judge Reinhold) and John Taggart (John Ashton) to stop a robbery/gun-running gang after Captain Andrew Bogomil (Ronny Cox) is shot and seriously wounded.

Despite it making less money than the first film and receiving mixed reviews from critics, the film was still a box office success, grossing $276.6 million. Aside from box office success, the film was nominated for an Oscar and for a Golden Globe Award for Best Original Song, for Bob Seger's "Shakedown".

Plot
Beverly Hills Police Captain Andrew Bogomil, Detective Billy Rosewood, and Sergeant John Taggart are trying to figure out who is behind the "Alphabet Crimes", a series of mostly high-end-store robberies distinguished by their monogrammed envelopes with an alphabetical sequence the assailants leave at the crime scene. Complicating matters is the new "political" state of the Beverly Hills Police Department, headed by incompetent, egotistical and verbally abusive new police chief Harold Lutz, who is doing everything he can to stay on Mayor Ted Egan's good side. Furious when Rosewood calls the FBI to help solve the case, Lutz holds Bogomil responsible as commanding officer and suspends him, despite Bogomil's efforts to convince the chief that Rosewood was only following a hunch. Lutz also punishes Taggart and Rosewood by placing them on traffic duty. On the way home, Bogomil is shot and injured by Karla Fry, the chief enforcer of Maxwell Dent, who is secretly the mastermind behind the Alphabet Crimes. After hearing about the shooting on a news report, Axel Foley secretly abandons his current undercover duties and immediately flies out to Beverly Hills to help find out who shot Bogomil, finding Taggart and Rosewood all too happy to assist him.

Posing as an undercover FBI agent to get past Lutz with the aid of Detective Jeffrey Friedman, Axel soon makes the connection between the robberies and Dent. He first finds out that the ammunition fired at one of the robberies was made by a gunsmith for Charles Cain, the manager of a gun club owned by Dent. Axel has Bogomil's daughter Jan use her connections as an insurance agent to find out about Dent's financial dealings. Dent is robbing his own businesses on purpose in order to finance firearms transactions with an arms dealer named Nikos Thomopolis and is discreetly using Cain as the front man for his operations. Bogomil was shot because his investigation was on the correct track into the case.

Having foiled a robbery attempt at a bank depot, Axel tricks Dent's accountant Sidney Bernstein into letting him use his computer, discovering that Dent and Karla are planning to leave the country. Axel also learns from Jan that all of Dent's businesses have had their insurance coverage canceled and are about to go bankrupt except his racetrack. Hurrying to the racetrack, Axel solves the latest riddle sent to the police, and is convinced that this riddle was made easily solvable in order to implicate Cain as the Alphabet Bandit and throw the authorities off Dent's trail.
 
The trio arrive but are unable to prevent the robbery and find Cain, shot by Karla, among those killed. While Lutz announces publicly that the Alphabet Crimes have been solved, Axel notices some red mud at the stables, which leads him, Taggart and Rosewood to Dent's oil field, where Dent is making his final arms deal with Thomopolis. The three get into a shootout with everyone involved in the deal. Rosewood destroys one shipment with a rocket-propelled grenade as the truck is leaving the scene, while Axel destroys another truck shipment with grenades.  Dent confronts Axel in the warehouse, but Axel gets distracted by one of Dent's henchmen on the roof above him and Dent gets away. Dent then crashes through the wall in his car and Axel shoots Dent through the windshield. The car hits Axel and goes down a hill, erupting in flames. Karla appears and is about to kill Axel, but Taggart comes to the rescue in time to save Axel and shoots her dead.

Just as the last criminals are about to flee, the police arrive and arrest the remainder of Dent's goons and Thomopolis. Lutz and Mayor Egan come as well. Lutz is furious at Rosewood and Taggart for their insubordination and attempts to arrest Axel. However, both Taggart and Rosewood, frustrated, stand up to an infuriated Lutz and prove that Dent was the real Alphabet Bandit and the rest of the alphabet crimes were about the arms deal. They are also able to convince Mayor Egan of Lutz's incompetence, and the mayor fires Lutz for his abusive attitude towards his own men and for jeopardizing the investigation.

Mayor Egan chooses Bogomil to replace Lutz as the new Police Chief. Axel returns to Detroit, but only after he is told off by Inspector Todd over the phone, after Egan called Todd to congratulate him on allowing Axel to assist them on this case.

Cast

 Eddie Murphy as Detective Axel Foley
 Judge Reinhold as Detective Billy Rosewood
 Jürgen Prochnow as Maxwell Dent
 John Ashton as Sergeant John Taggart
 Ronny Cox as Captain Andrew Bogomil
 Brigitte Nielsen as Karla Fry
 Allen Garfield as Chief Harold Lutz
 Brian O'Connor as Detective Biddle
 Dean Stockwell as Charles Cain
 Gil Hill as Inspector Douglas Todd
 Gilbert Gottfried as Sidney Bernstein
 Paul Reiser as Detective Jeffrey Friedman
 Paul Guilfoyle as Nikos Thomopolis
 Robert Ridgely as Mayor Ted Egan
 Alice Adair as Jan Bogomil
 Glenn Withrow as Willie
 Tom Bower as Russ Fielding
 Hugh Hefner as Himself
 Frank Pesce as Carlotta 
 Chris Rock as Parking Valet
 Valerie Wildman as Gun Club Receptionist 
 Robert Pastorelli as Vinnie
 Tommy 'Tiny' Lister as Orvis
 John Hostetter as Stiles

Production
Paramount Pictures had planned a television series based on the first film. Murphy turned down the series but was willing to do a sequel. Producers Simpson and Bruckheimer hired Tony Scott to direct due to his success with the 1986 blockbuster film Top Gun. The film was originally to be set and filmed in London and Paris; however, the script was re-written after Murphy expressed a reluctance to film outside the United States.

Eddie Murphy's salary to star in the movie was $8 million. The budget of the movie was $27 million. Ronny Cox was going to have more screen time in the film, but couldn't due to his role in Robocop. Filming began on November 10, 1986 and concluded on March 25, 1987 after 135 days of filming.

Film editor Billy Weber said:“Marty Brest had passed on the sequel, and Tony was available. But, he wasn’t a comedy guy, so after we ran the first cut, Don and Jerry just looked around, and shrugged, and said, “Huh.” It wasn’t a comedy – it played like a straight action movie, which made sense, because Tony was an action guy, and that’s what he knew how to do best, so it was really action heavy. We just never had a great script, and it never had a chance of being as good as the first movie because the script never got there. They re-wrote the script after the first screening and more jokes were shot and added in, and it brought it up a little bit. Eddie also started to act up on the set, the primadonna behavior was starting to show, and he was always late for filming, but he got along great with Tony.“

Soundtrack

The song "Hold On" as sung by Keta Bill plays during the scene wherein Axel, Rosewood and Taggart confront Dent at the Playboy Mansion. However, the film's soundtrack album, released by MCA Records, includes only a different version sung by Corey Hart, with different lyrics. The film introduced George Michael's controversial song "I Want Your Sex", a number 2 hit on the Billboard Hot 100. It also includes "Cross My Broken Heart" by The Jets (a Top 10 hit on the Billboard Hot 100) and "Shakedown" by Bob Seger (which became a  1 hit on that same chart), as well as "Better Way" performed by James Ingram. The Pointer Sisters scored a moderate hit with "Be There" (#42 on the Hot 100), their single from the soundtrack. It was the second time the sisters had contributed to the Beverly Hills Cop franchise; they'd notched a top 10 single with "Neutron Dance" from the Beverly Hills Cop soundtrack. Harold Faltermeyer's 1988 album, Harold F, includes a song called "Bad Guys", which is used as part of the film's score—an instrumental section of the song plays during the opening jewelry store robbery scene, and also during several other scenes throughout the film.

The soundtrack debuted at  8 on the Billboard 200 albums charts and spent 26 weeks on the charts, a far cry compared to the 49 weeks spent by the first film's soundtrack. Despite this, one song from the album, "Shakedown", was nominated for an Academy Award and the Golden Globe Award for Best Original Song. However, another song from the album, "I Want Your Sex", won the Razzie Award for Worst Song, despite it going on to achieve a platinum certification for sales by the Recording Industry Association of America.

Reception

Box office
Beverly Hills Cop II was one of the most anticipated films of 1987 and became a box office success upon release, despite not making as much as Beverly Hills Cop. The film debuted at number one at the US box office, earning $33 million on its opening weekend, a sales mark that would result in the film achieving that year's highest-opening weekend debut, as well as the highest grossing opening weekend of all time at the time. Beverly Hills Cop II grossed $153,665,036 in the United States and Canada, becoming the third biggest hit domestically at the box office that year, after Fatal Attraction and Three Men and a Baby, and grossed $276.6 million worldwide, the second highest-grossing film worldwide that year, behind Fatal Attraction.

Critical reception
The film received mixed reviews from critics. On Rotten Tomatoes, the film has a 46% "rotten" rating, based on 39 reviews, with an average rating of 5.1/10. The site's critical consensus reads, "Eddie Murphy remains appealing as the wisecracking Axel Foley, but Beverly Hills Cop II doesn't take him – or the viewer – anywhere new enough to justify a sequel". On Metacritic, the film has a score of 48 out of 100, based on 11 critics, indicating "mixed or average reviews". Audiences polled by CinemaScore gave the film an average grade of "A−" on an A+ to F scale.

Desson Howe of The Washington Post called it "a sequel that's as good as the original, if not better."  Roger Ebert gave the film one star out of four and wrote, "What is comedy? That's a pretty basic question, I know, but Beverly Hills Cop II never thought to ask it."  Janet Maslin of The New York Times wrote that the film is a skillful clone of the first film that can't match that one's novelty or excitement.  Variety called it "a noisy, numbing, unimaginative, heartless remake of the original film."  Sheila Benson of the Los Angeles Times wrote, "It's hard to believe that the group who came up with the hard, clean edges of Top Gun, sleek and unfeeling though it may have been, could make a picture as crude, as muddled, as destructo-Derbyish as this one."

"Beverly Hills Cop II was probably the most successful mediocre picture in history," Murphy said. "It made $250 million worldwide, and it was a half-assed movie. Cop II was basically a rehash of Cop I, but it wasn't as spontaneous and funny."

Accolades

Literature
 1987: Robert Tine: Beverly Hills Cop II: A Novel,  Pocket; Mti edition,

References

External links

 
 
 
 
 

II
1987 films
1980s English-language films
1980s action comedy films
1980s buddy comedy films
1980s police comedy films
American action comedy films
American buddy comedy films
American buddy cop films
American sequel films
Fictional portrayals of the Detroit Police Department
Films directed by Tony Scott
Films produced by Don Simpson
Films produced by Jerry Bruckheimer
Films set in Beverly Hills, California
Films set in Detroit
Films set in Los Angeles
Films shot in Los Angeles
Golden Raspberry Award winning films
Murder in films
Paramount Pictures films
Films with screenplays by Larry Ferguson
Films scored by Harold Faltermeyer
1980s buddy cop films
1987 comedy films
Films with screenplays by Warren Skaaren
1980s American films